Christian "Christ" Pickart (November 15, 1870 – January 6, 1938) was a member of the Wisconsin State Assembly.

Biography
Pickart was born on November 15, 1870, in Marshfield, Fond du Lac County, Wisconsin. He died on January 6, 1938, in Malone, Wisconsin.

Career
Pickart was elected to the Assembly in 1904. He was a Democrat.

References

External links

People from Fond du Lac County, Wisconsin
Democratic Party members of the Wisconsin State Assembly
1870 births
1938 deaths
Burials in Wisconsin